Vincentian Creole is an English-based creole language spoken in Saint Vincent and the Grenadines. It contains elements of Spanish, Antillean Creole, and various Iberian Romance languages. It has also been influenced by the indigenous Kalinago/Garifuna elements and by African language brought over the Atlantic Ocean by way of the slave trade. Over the years the creole has changed to be a mix of all of those languages.

Pronunciation
Hard sounds at the end of words are avoided. There are mainly two ways hard sounds are evaded: 
 by changing the order of the sounds. Example: "ask" is rendered as "aks"
 by dropping the last sound. Example: "desk" pronounced as "dess" and "tourist" as "touriss"
 For words ending in "-er", the "-er" sound changes to an "ah" sound. Example: "never" is pronounced as "nevah" and clever as "clevah"
For words ending in "-th", the soft "-th" sound is replaced by the hard "t" sound as if the "h" were dropped. Example: "with" is rendered as "wit" and "earth" as "eart"
For words ending in "-own", the "-own" is rendered as "-ung". Examples: down is rendered "dung" and town is rendered "tung"
Words beginning with "dr" change to " j". Examples: driver is rendered 'jiver' and "drop off" as "jop off"

Grammar
Generally, there is no need for concord. The verb in its plural form is simply placed after the subject of the sentence. The object of the sentence is then placed after the verb, as in English. If there are both a direct object and an indirect object, the indirect object is placed directly after the verb followed by the direct object.

The subject pronouns are as shown in the following table.

With regards to tense, the present tense is indicated by the use of the modal "does" (for habitual actions) or by the use of the present participle ending in "-ing" (for actions one is currently doing). The past tense is indicated by the use of either what is in English the plural form of the present tense of the verb, the modal "did", "been"/"bin" or the past participle of the verb. The future tense is indicated by the use of the present participle of the verb "to go", which is "going" (gine or gwine in the creole), or the plural form of the verb, "go".

Vocabulary

See also
Antiguan Creole
Belizean Creole
Jamaican Patois
Bajan Creole
Bermudian English
Trinidadian Creole
Antillean Creole

References

Languages of Saint Vincent and the Grenadines
English-based pidgins and creoles
English language in the Caribbean
Languages of the African diaspora
Creoles of the Caribbean